Ric Fierabracci is an American bassist who has toured and/or recorded with such artists as Frank Gambale, Chick Corea, Sir Tom Jones, Dave Weckl, Billy Cobham, Bradley Joseph, Shakira, Nancy Sinatra, Planet X, The 5th Dimension, The Beach Boys, and Yanni.  He is featured on Yanni's live concert videos and albums Live at the Acropolis, Live at Royal Albert Hall, and Tribute, most recently touring during the 2003 Ethnicity world tour.  He also appears in Shakira's music video "Inevitable".  Fierabracci had performed as the house bassist at the L.A. jazz club "The Baked Potato" until he relocated to New York City, and has also contributed to numerous TV and film jingles.

Discography
Hemispheres (2007) with Phil Turcio on keyboards, Joel Rosenblatt on drums and cymbals, and Fierabracci on the basses.

References
Official website

External links
Official website
Discussion With Ric Fierabracci, 2/01/2008

20th-century American bass guitarists
American jazz bass guitarists
American male bass guitarists
Living people
1963 births
20th-century American male musicians
American male jazz musicians